Night Song(s) or Nightsong(s) may refer to:

Film and television
Night Song (1948 film), an American drama film directed by John Cromwell
Night Song (2016 film), a French-Canadian film directed by Raphaël Nadjari
Nightsongs, a 2003 film adaptation of Jon Fosse's play (see below), directed by Romuald Karmakar
"Nightsong", an episode of The Twilight Zone
"Night Song", an episode of Follow the Sun
Nightsongs, a 1985 American Playhouse production

Literature
Night Song, a 1961 novel by John A. Williams
Night Song, a 1994 novel by Beverly Jenkins
Night Songs, a 1984 novel by Charles L. Grant
Nightsong, a 1986 novel by Valerie Sherwood
Nightsong, a 2012 book by Ari Berk
Nightsongs (play) (Natta syng sine songar), a 1997 play by Jon Fosse

Music

Classical
"Nachtlied" (lit. "Nightsong"), a song by Carl Loewe
Night Song, for orchestra by Wayne Barlow, 1956
"Night Song", a musical setting of a poem by Langston Hughes, by Howard Swanson
"A Night Song", a song by Charles Ives
Night Songs, a composition by David Dubery
Night Songs, three songs by Alec Roth
Night Songs, four songs by Madeleine Dring, 1976
Night Songs, for orchestra by Helen Grime, 2012
Nightsongs I, for violin and piano by Arlene Zallman, 1984

Albums
Night Song (Ahmad Jamal album), 1980
Night Song (Al Grey album), 1963
Night Song (Arthur Blythe album) or the title song, 1997
Night Song (Kenny Burrell album), 1969
Night Song (Ketil Bjørnstad and Svante Henryson album) or the title song, 2011
Night Song (Mike LeDonne album), 2005
Night Song (Nusrat Fateh Ali Khan album) or the title song, 1996
Night Song, by Mighty Clouds of Joy, 1989
Night Songs (Cinderella album) or the title song, 1986
Night Songs (Barry Manilow album) 2014
Night Songs, by Janis Siegel, 2013
Night Songs, by Jonathan Kreisberg, 2009
Night Songs, by Renée Fleming, 2001
Nightsong, by the King's Singers, 1997
Nightsong, by Sidsel Endresen and Bugge Wesseltoft, 1994
Nightsongs (Earl Klugh album) or the title song, "Night Song", 1984
Nightsongs (Stars album), 2001
Nightsongs, by Yael Naim, 2020

Songs
"Night Song", written by Lee Adams and Charles Strouse for the musical Golden Boy, 1964; recorded by many performers
"Night Song", by Crosby, Stills, Nash & Young from American Dream, 1988

See also
Lullaby
Nocturne
Song of the Night (disambiguation)